Acson Malaysia Sales & Service Sdn Bhd is a Malaysian air conditioner brand and a subsidiary of Daikin.

History
It was founded in 1984 and was known as O.Y.L. Manufacturing Company Sdn. Bhd.

The company was acquired by Daikin in 2006.

References

External links

Daikin
Malaysian brands
2006 mergers and acquisitions
Manufacturing companies established in 1984
1984 establishments in Malaysia